Guaiwei, literally "exotic taste" or "strange taste", is a seasoning mixture in Sichuan cuisine of China. Although it is popular in the Sichuan province, it is seldom used outside the region's cuisine, unlike yuxiang, another seasoning mixture of the region. The guaiwei seasoning exists in several forms but can be viewed as the combination of yuxiang and mala seasoning with a high proportion of sesame and sour ingredients.

Preparation
The ingredients of guaiwei always consists of either some or all of each group of:
Sesame: Using either ground sesame, sesame oil, or sesame paste
Sour: Using either lemon juice or more traditionally, dark rice vinegar (香醋)
Yuxiang 
Piquant: Using Sichuan peppercorns, occasionally without chilis
Savoury: Using soy sauce or salt and less commonly, doubanjiang
Sugar
Huangjiu (Chinese rice wine) may be used occasionally

Preparation of the seasoning mixture can be done cold or hot, with cold mixtures being richer and heavier and hot mixtures lighter in taste.

Dishes
Dishes that use guaiwei as the main seasoning has the term affixed to its name. For instance:
Guàiwèijī (怪味鸡): Chicken braised in guaiwei
Guàiwèidǔsī (怪味肚丝): Pork tripe braised in guaiwei
Guàiwèiniújiàn (怪味牛腱): Guaiwei beef shank
Guàiwèidòu (怪味豆): Guaiwei fava beans, eaten as a snack

References

Sichuan cuisine
Food ingredients